Polesian District was a district of Second Polish Republic from 1920 to 1921. Its capital was Pinsk. It was formed on 20 December 1920 from the parts of Brześć and Volhynian Districts of the freshly disestablished Provisional Administration of Front-line and Phase Territories. On 19 February 1921 it was reformed into Polesian Voivodeship.

History 
Polesian District was established as the district of Second Polish Republic on 20 December 1920. It was formed from the northwestern part of Brześć District and a northern part of Volhynian District. It replaced the administration of the Provisional Administration of Front-line and Phase Territories in the region. The region was governed by the Chief of District, a public official, who was a representative of the Council of Ministers, responsible for the implementation of the laws as well as superior to local administration offices.

From Brześć District were included 8 counties: Białowieża, Brześć, Drohiczyn, Kobryń, Kosów, Łuniniec, Pińsk and Prużana County. From Volhynian District was included Koszyrski County.

On 14 August 1921, Białowieża County waw incorporated into then-established Białystok Voivodeship. On 19 February 1921, the district was reformed into the Polesian Voivodeship.

Subdivision

Counties 
Białowieża County (until 1921)
Brześć County
Drohiczyn County
Kobryń County
Kosów County
Koszyrski County
Łuniniec County
Pińsk County
Prużana County

Notes

References 

States and territories established in 1920
States and territories disestablished in 1921
1920 establishments in Poland
1921 disestablishments in Poland
Districts of the Second Polish Republic
Polesie Voivodeship
Western Belorussia (1918–1939)